Dobropillia (— Dobropolye) is a city in the Pokrovsk Raion of the Donetsk Oblast (province) in Ukraine. Prior to 2020, it was a city of oblast significance and served as the administrative center of the former Dobropillia Raion, though it did not belong to the raion.

Population: 40,064 (1989);  Distance to Donetsk - .

History
A local newspaper is published here since February 1935.

During the Second World War, the settlement was occupied by Axis troops. City since 1953. In 1970, the population of the city was 30 thousand people, the basis of the economy was coal mining.

Demographics
As of the Ukrainian Census of 2001:

Ethnicity
 Ukrainians: 71.3%
 Russians: 25.9%
 Belarusians: 1.1%
 Tatars: 0.4%
 Greeks: 0.2%

Language
Russian: 61.0%
Ukrainian: 38.5%
Belarusian: 0.1%

References

 
Cities in Donetsk Oblast
Pokrovsk Raion
Populated places established in the Russian Empire
1840s establishments in the Russian Empire